The Invaders was an R&B band in the island of Bermuda during the late 1960s. They had a hit with "Spacing Out".

Background
The Invaders was started by Ralph Richardson in Bermuda in 1968. It included Lloyd Williams as well. Williams had come in to replace the saxophonist. In 1969, the band produced its first hit 45, "Spacing Out", written by Richardson, which made it to the top of the Bermuda charts and remained there for several weeks. Within a few months, the band produced its first album with the same title. Both 45 and album were underwritten by Eddie De Mello.

Album
Their lone album Spacing Out which has some similarity to the funk of The Meters is highly collectable.

Career
By late 1969, Phillips Recording Studios in the UK offered the band a six-month tour of Europe and a recording contract. By 1970, the band, whose members where then part-time musicians, decided to call it quits.

In 1997, De Mello digitized the original sound tracks and produced a CD of the album which is still available.

Band members
 Ralph Richardson, Sr - Trumpet
 Sturgis Griffin Jr - Congas
 Lloyd Williams - Alto Sax / Flute
 Artie Simmons - Tenor Sax (Guest)
 Stan Gilbert - Bass
 John Burch - Guitar
 Mike Stowe - Drums

References

Musical groups established in 1968
Musical groups disestablished in 1970
Bermudian musical groups
1968 establishments in Bermuda
1970 disestablishments in Bermuda